Natsuse Dam is a gravity dam located in Akita Prefecture in Japan. The dam is used for power production. The catchment area of the dam is 637.4 km2. The dam impounds about 86  ha of land when full and can store 5959 thousand cubic meters of water. The construction of the dam was started on 1938 and completed in 1940.

References

Dams in Akita Prefecture
1940 establishments in Japan